Colin Hubert Heron (12 November 1924 – 19 March 2010) was a Jamaican first-class cricketer.

Heron was born at Mandeville in Jamaica to Charles Hubert Heron and his wife, Leila Augusta Harty. He was educated in Mandeville at Manchester High School. After completing his education, Heron became an accountant for Deloitte Haskins & Sells. He lived in England at some point, appearing in minor counties cricket for Cheshire, making six appearances the Minor Counties Championship; three each in 1958 and 1960. He moved to British Guiana shortly after and appeared for the British Guiana cricket team in one first-class cricket match in October 1961 against Trinidad at Rose Hall. Batting once in the match, Heron ended British Guiana's first-innings total of 501 all out unbeaten on 15. With his right-arm fast-medium bowling he took 2 wickets in Trinidad's first-innings, dismissing Marcus Minshall and Pascall Roberts to finish with figures of 2 for 54 from 21 overs; Trinidad followed-on in their second-innings, with Heron going wicketless, conceding 47 runs from 13 overs.

He married Cicely Indranee in June 1967, with the couple having two children. Heron later emigrated to Canada, where he died at St. Mary's of the Lake Hospital in Kingston, Ontario in March 2010, following a short battle with cancer.

References

External links

1924 births
2010 deaths
People from Mandeville, Jamaica
Jamaican accountants
Jamaican cricketers
Cheshire cricketers
Guyana cricketers
Jamaican emigrants to Canada
Deaths from cancer in Ontario